God's Gift was a British dating game show that aired on ITV from 4 January 1996 to 3 April 1998. The first series was presented by Davina McCall and Claudia Winkleman hosted the second series. The show's title came from the phrase "God's gift to women", i.e. an ironic description of a would-be Casanova.

Format
Each week, five male contestants would vie with each other to win the affections and votes of a female audience (or a male audience on "gay specials") by participating in a series of facetious games designed to "test" their sex appeal. The winner's prize would be to take an audience member of his choice out on a date, which was then filmed for broadcast in the following week's show.

Broadcast
The series was broadcast in the early hours of a Thursday morning and was usually repeated in the early hours of Sunday morning on ITV, although not every region took the series. The second series was axed after fewer regions decided to broadcast it.

Series guide
Series 1: 50 editions including 2 best of compilations, first shown from 3 January 1996
Series 2:  25 editions, first shown from 26 July 1997

External links
 
 

1996 British television series debuts
1998 British television series endings
1990s British game shows
English-language television shows
ITV game shows
Television series by ITV Studios
Television shows produced by Granada Television